Evagoras Christofi (born 28 June 1961) is a retired Cypriot football defender.

References

1961 births
Living people
Cypriot footballers
AC Omonia players
Association football defenders
Cypriot First Division players
Cyprus international footballers